Events from 2004 in Switzerland.

Events

Incumbents
Joseph Deiss -- President of the Confederation 2004
Samuel Schmid -- Vice-President of the Confederation 2004
Max Binder -- President of the National Council 2004
Fritz Schiesser -- President of the Council of States 2004
Heinz Aemisegger - President of the Federal Supreme Court 2003-2004
Giusep Nay - Vice-President of the Federal Supreme Court 2003-2004

Awards

Literary awards
Aargauer Literaturpreis 2004: Anna Felder
Prix Dentan 2004: Jean-Michel Olivier for "L'enfant secret"
Gottfried-Keller-Preis 2004: Klaus Merz
Prix Littéraire Lipp Suisse 2004: Yvette Z'Graggen for "Un étang sous la glace"
Prix Georges-Nicole 2004: Jean-Euphèle Milcé for "L'Alphabet des nuits"
Prix Eugène Rambert 2004: Thomas Bouvier
Prix Edouard Rod 2004: Georges Haldas
Grosser Schillerpreis 2005: Erika Burkart
ZKB Schillerpreis 2004: Christoph Keller for "Der beste Tänzer"
Solothurner Literaturpreis 2004: Barbara Honigmann
Spycher: Literaturpreis Leuk 2004: Felicitas Hoppe and Marcel Beyer

Film awards
Swiss Film Prize 2004 (Schweizer Filmpreis/Prix du cinéma suisse)
Fiction: "Jagged Harmonies - Bach vs. Frederick II" by Dominique de Rivaz
Documentary: "Mais in Bundeshuss - Le génie helvétique" by Jean-Stéphane Bron 
Short film: "L'escalier" by Frédéric Mermoud 
Performance in a leading role: Bettina Stucky as "Meier Marilyn" in "Meier Marilyn" by Stina Werenfels
Performance in a supporting role: Gilles Tschudi as "Secretary Goltz" in Jagged Harmonies - Bach vs. Frederick II by Dominique de Rivaz
Special Jury Prize: Corinna Glaus for casting the film "Ready, Steady, Charlie!"
Golden Leopard 2004: Private by Saverio Costanzo
Berner Filmpreis: Dieter Fahrer for the documentary "Que sera?"
Luzerner Filmpreis: "The Last Connection" by Marcel Baumann and "Wackelkontakt" by Ralph Etter
Cinéma Tout Ecran 2004: Best Film "Avanim" by Raphaël Nadjari
Zürcher Filmpreis: 
"Im Nordwind" by Bettina Oberli, "Verflixt verliebt" by Peter Luisi, "Ma famille africaine" by Thomas Thümena, "Krokus – as long as we live" by Reto Caduff.
Fred van der Kooij, film director, and Matthias Brunner, movie theater director.

See also: List of film awards

Other
Swiss Award 2003:
Swiss of the Year: Roger Federer
Culture: Mario Botta, architect
Economy: Hansueli Loosli, member of management Coop.
Entertainment: DJ Bobo
Politics: Micheline Calmy-Rey
Society: Jacob Kellenberger, president ICRC.
Sports: Roger Federer
Marcel Benoist Prize 2004:	Adriano Aguzzi, neuropathologist at University of Zurich
Swiss Big Brother Award 2004 (5th)
Government: Hansruedi Fehrlin, corps commander of the Swiss Air Force (use of surveillance drones)
Business: santésuisse (Tarmed system)
Workplace: Zurich Municipal Police (email surveillance)
Lifetime achievement: Josef Leu, National Councillor CVP/LU (parliamentary work)
Winkelried-Award: Daniele Jenni (attorney of WEF opponents)
Prix Evenir 2004: Team Veloland Schweiz (Markus Capirone, Thomas Ledergerber, Martin Utiger and Peter Anrig)
Prix Gaïa 2004: André Beyner
Louis-Jeantet Prize for Medicine 2004: Hans Clevers and Alec J. Jeffreys
Schweizer KleinKunstPreis 2004: Jean Claude Sassine and Andreas Thiel
National Latsis-Prize 2004: Simon Gächter
Miss Suisse 2004: Fiona Hefti
Miss Suisse Romande 2004: Céline Nusbaumer
Hans-Reinhart-Ring 2005: Dominique Catton
Credit Suisse Sports Awards 2004:
Swiss Sportsperson of the Year
Female: Karin Thürig
Male: Roger Federer
Team: Patrick Heuscher and Stefan Kobel, beach volleyball players
Newcomer: Marcel Hug
Disabled: Urs Kolly
Coach: Rolf Kalich
ThinkQuest Swiss Web Awards 2004: "Neeracherried ein Flachmoor" 
Grand Prix of the Fondation vaudoise pour la promotion et la création artistiques 2004: Thierry Lang
Wakker Prize 2004: City of Biel/Bienne
Prix Walo 2003
Public's favorite: Sven Epiney
Honorary: César Keiser and Margrit Läubli
Pop: Lunik
Rock: Patent Ochsner 
Volksmusik: Original Streichmusik Alder
Comedy: Lorenz Keiser 
Actor: Esther Gemsch
Film: Achtung, fertig, Charlie!
Newcomer: Mia Aegerter 
TV: Lüthi & Blanc
Kunstpreis der Stadt Zürich: Pierre Favre
Johann-Jakob-Bodmer-Medaille: Ilma Rakusa

See also: Balzan Prize, Rose d'Or

Deaths
January 19: Walter Hagmann, 72, National Councillor (1963–1975)
February 1: O. W. Fischer, 89, German actor, Ticino resident since the 1960s
February 7: Willi Gautschi, 84, historian
February 24?: Rudolf von Albertini, 80, historian
March 11: Hans Gygax, 98, author
March 17: Monique Laederach, 65, French and German language author
March 29: Peter Ustinov, 82, actor
March 31: Hedi Lang, 72, politician, first woman to preside the National Council, member of the government the canton of Zurich
April 15: Hans Gmür, 77, theatre author, director, composer, and producer
April 17: Edmond Pidoux, 95, author
April 24: José Giovanni, 80, French author, crime writer, film producer
May 1: Felix Haug, 52, pop musician (Double)
May 16: Andreas Dürr, 70, National Councillor (1970–1983)
May 24: Karl Bachmann, 88, politician, National Councillor from Schwyz in the 1960s
May 28: Carlos Grosjean, 85, National Councillor
May 30: Christian Staub, 85, photographer
June 4: Werner Spross, 79, businessman
June 6: Louis Conne, 98, sculptor and graphist
June 9: Roland Ruffieux, c. 81, historian
June 15: Ulrich Inderbinen, 103, mountain guide
June: Riccardo Anselmi, 58, musician
June: Rolf Wüthrich, 65, football player
June 30: Paul Bürgi, 83, politician, parliamentarian of St. Gallen (1959–1987)
July 1: Ettore Cella, 90, actor, director, author, and translator
July 4: Jean-Marie Auberson, 84, orchestra conductor
July 14: Hans A. Pestalozzi, 75, author, manager, social critic
July 17: Alfred Hofkunst, 61, artist
August 17: Clo Duri Bezzola, 59, Romansh language author, teacher
August: Walo Bertschinger, construction entrepreneur
August 22: Ota Šik, 84, Czech economist and politician, professor at St. Gallen
August 24: Elisabeth Kübler-Ross, 78, Swiss-born American psychiatrist
August 28: Sigi Feigel, 83, attorney
September 29: Alberto Camenzind, 90, architect (Professor emeritus at the ETH Zurich)
October 2: Robert Leuenberger, 88, theologian, president of the University of Zurich, father of Moritz Leuenberger
October 4: Willy Guhl, 89, designer
October 8: Rico Weber, 62, artist
October 15: Walter Bretscher, 66, screenwriter, journalist
October 16: Mario Santi, 63, Sports commentator
October 22: Jean-François Leuba, 70, politician
October 30: Ernst Cincera, 77, National Councillor
November 4: Beat Tschümperlin, 50, politician, member of the Nidwalden government in office
November 8: Davy Sidjanski, 49, editor
November 16: Hans Künzi, 80, politician
November 21: Uwe Scholz, 45, German dance choreographer, director Zurich Opera ballet (1985–1991)
November 26: Hans Schaffner, 96, member of the Federal Council in the 1960s
November 27: 7 fire fighters in Gretzenbach
December 1: Rudolf Gisler, 62, politician, former Landammann of Glarus
December 16: Dietrich Schwanitz, 64, German professor and author, grew up in Switzerland.
December 17: Gyula Marsovsky, 68, Grand Prix motorcycle rider 
December 18: Marcel Pasche, 73, former Edipresse manager, 24 Heures editor-in-chief.
December: Heinrich (Heini) Gränicher, 71, ETH professor for experimental physics
December 22: Peter Schärer, 71, dean of Dental School, Zurich
December 26: Otto Marchi, 62, writer, one of the Swiss tsunami victims
December 28, Aldo Zappia, 80, football player 

See also: Deaths in 2004, List of Swiss people, 2005 in Switzerland#Deaths.

 
2000s in Switzerland
Years of the 21st century in Switzerland
Switzerland
Switzerland